Gandala is a small village located on the eastern coastline of Ganjam District in the Indian state of Odisha. Gandala is a panchayat under the block of Hinjilicut near to Berhampur City. the majority of people Gandala are dependent on farming.

Demographics
According to a 2013 report on world Gazetter India census, Gandala-Belagan had a population of 8389 which is more than Gopalpur port town. Gandala is a Panchayat (with one village) & Belagan also a Panchayat (with one village). Both the villages are merged about 30 years back like Hinjili and katu.

Gandala: In 2011 – 4652, and in 2013 – 5199
Belagan: In 2011 – 3154, and in 2013 – 3190

Health care
Veterinary Hospital in Gondala, Ganjam

Bank and Post Office
 UNITED BANK OF INDIA(IFSC-UTBI0GNB475) GANDALA-BELGAON
 DHANEI KGFS GANDALA PRIVATE
 Head Post Office Gandala

Education
 Primary School Near main Market
 Primary School in bandha sahi
 Saraswati Sisu Mandira
 Ganesh Vidya Peeth (established 1959)
 Sri Beleswar (Junior) Mahavidyalaya, Gandala (established 1993)
 Sri Beleswar Degree Mahavidyalaya, Gandala (established 1997)

References

Villages in Ganjam district